A telluroketone is an analog of a ketone in which the oxygen atom has been replaced by a tellurium atom. This change makes the functional group less stable, requiring greater steric and electronic stabilization.

References 

Organotellurium compounds
Functional groups
Tellurium(II) compounds